Schallenberg Castle is a ruined hilltop castle in Kleinzell im Mühlkreis, Rohrbach District, Upper Austria.

The castle, likely built around 1231, is the namesake of the noble Schallenberg family, who took ownership of it in 1260. It was destroyed by Hussites in the mid-15th century, and has been returned to Schallenberg possession since 1982.

References

External links
Ruine Schallenberg at Kleinzell im Mühlkreis municipal website (in German)

Buildings and structures completed in 1231
Ruined castles in Austria
Castles in Upper Austria
Castle